Badger Head is a locality and small rural community in the local government area of West Tamar, in the Western Tamar Valley region of Tasmania. Bass Strait forms the north-western and part of the northern boundaries. The 2016 census determined a population of 41 for the state suburb of Badger Head.

History
The locality name was assigned in 1999, and the boundary with York Town was adjusted in 2007.

Road infrastructure
The C721 route (Badger Head Road) intersects with the West Tamar Highway at the south-eastern extremity of the locality. It passes through to the north-west, where it terminates in the Badger Head township.

References

Localities of West Tamar Council
Towns in Tasmania